Charles Kwame Takyi (born 12 November 1984) is a Ghanaian former professional footballer who played as a midfielder.

Club career

Early career
Born in Accra, Ghana, Takyi moved to Berlin with his parents when he was five years old. He started playing for Tennis Borussia Berlin and joined the FC Schalke 04 youth setup when he was 15 years old.

Schalke 04
Takyis first senior season was with FC Schalke 04 II, the reserve team of FC Schalke 04, in 2003. Although making 21 appearances for the team and scoring three goals, Takyi never managed to get into the professional squad. After one year at Schalke, he left the Gelsenkirchen team and joined Hamburger SV.

Hamburger SV
Like in Schalke, Takyi was a member of Hamburgs second team, known as Hamburger SV II. He became a key member in his first season with the team, appearing in 28 of 36 possible games, 27 times as a starter. For the 2005–06 season, he was promoted to the senior besides playing for HSV II. He made his Bundesliga debut on 10 December 2005 against Hertha BSC Berlin, coming in as a substitute for Guy Demel in the 71st minute. It was the only league game Takyi made during his time at Hamburg. With HSV II, he finished in 13th place at the end of the 2005–06 season avoiding relegation with the club.

AC Horsens
After six months without a contract, Takyi joined Danish Superliga side AC Horsens. He signed a six-month contract with the Danish side. He made his Superliga debut on 3 March 2013 against  Nordsjælland, receiving a yellow card in the 38th minute of a 1–0 defeat.

Retirement
In November 2018, it was reported Takyi had retired as a player.

International career
While playing for Germany at youth levels, Takyi expressed his favor to play for his birth country. The Ghana Football Association applied to FIFA for a nationality switch of Takyi in November 2011. In October 2011, it was reported that Takyi was giving permission to play for Ghana. He was first called up for the national team in November 2011 for the friendlies against Gabon and Sierra Leone. Takyi made his debut for the Black Stars in the friendly against Gabon on 14 November 2011.

Takyi was included in the Ghana national team's 23 man squad for the 2012 Africa Cup of Nations in January 2012 and he made his tournament debut, coming on as a substitute for Sulley Muntari in the 2012 Africa Cup of Nations Group D match against Mali on 28 January 2012.

References

Honours
Hamburger SV
Bundesliga third place: 2005–06

External links
 

1984 births
Living people
Footballers from Accra
Ghanaian emigrants to Germany
Naturalized citizens of Germany
German sportspeople of Ghanaian descent
Ghanaian footballers
German footballers
Ghana international footballers
Association football midfielders
Germany youth international footballers
2012 Africa Cup of Nations players
FC Schalke 04 II players
Hamburger SV II players
Hamburger SV players
FC St. Pauli players
SpVgg Greuther Fürth players
AC Horsens players
FC Energie Cottbus players
FC Viktoria 1889 Berlin players
KFC Uerdingen 05 players
Bundesliga players
2. Bundesliga players
Danish Superliga players
Ghanaian expatriate footballers
German expatriate footballers
Ghanaian expatriate sportspeople in Denmark
German expatriate sportspeople in Denmark
Expatriate men's footballers in Denmark
Ghanaian expatriate sportspeople in the United Arab Emirates
German expatriate sportspeople in the United Arab Emirates
Expatriate footballers in the United Arab Emirates